Shorea affinis is a plant species in the family Dipterocarpaceae endemic to Sri Lanka.

References

Flora of Sri Lanka
affinis
Endangered plants
Taxonomy articles created by Polbot